Greencastle railway station was on the Belfast and Ballymena Railway which ran from Belfast to Ballymena in Northern Ireland.

History

The station was opened by the Belfast and Ballymena Railway on 11 April 1848.

The station closed to passengers on 1 June 1916.

References 

Disused railway stations in County Antrim
Railway stations opened in 1848
Railway stations closed in 1916

Railway stations in Northern Ireland opened in 1848